Pietro Aurino (born November 16, 1976, in Torre Annunziata, Province of Naples) is a retired male boxer from Italy. Nicknamed The Killer he represented his native country at the 1996 Summer Olympics in Atlanta, Georgia, where he was stopped in the second round of the men's light-heavyweight division (– 81 kg) by Kazakhstan's eventual gold medalist Vassili Jirov. He challenged once for the WBO world cruiserweight title in 2000.

Professional boxing record

|-
|align="center" colspan=8|38 Wins (16 knockouts, 22 decisions) 3 Losses (3 knockouts)
|-
| align="center" style="border-style: none none solid solid; background: #e3e3e3"|Result
| align="center" style="border-style: none none solid solid; background: #e3e3e3"|Record
| align="center" style="border-style: none none solid solid; background: #e3e3e3"|Opponent
| align="center" style="border-style: none none solid solid; background: #e3e3e3"|Type
| align="center" style="border-style: none none solid solid; background: #e3e3e3"|Round
| align="center" style="border-style: none none solid solid; background: #e3e3e3"|Date
| align="center" style="border-style: none none solid solid; background: #e3e3e3"|Location
| align="center" style="border-style: none none solid solid; background: #e3e3e3"|Notes
|-align=center
|Win
|
|align=left| Adrian Rajkai
|PTS
|6
|24/03/2007
|align=left| Alsterdorfer Sporthalle, Alsterdorf, Hamburg
|align=left|
|-
|Loss
|
|align=left| Marco Huck
|TKO
|2
|16/12/2006
|align=left| BigBox, Kempten, Bavaria
|align=left|
|-
|Win
|
|align=left| Romans Dabolins
|UD
|8
|01/08/2006
|align=left| Forte Michelangelo, Civitavecchia, Lazio
|align=left|
|-
|Win
|
|align=left| Christopher Robert
|PTS
|8
|19/05/2006
|align=left| Palazzetto dello Sport, Abano Terme, Veneto
|align=left|
|-
|Win
|
|align=left| Zoltán Béres
|PTS
|6
|10/03/2006
|align=left| Palasport, Bergamo, Lombardy
|align=left|
|-
|Win
|
|align=left| Ramdane Serdjane
|PTS
|6
|22/07/2005
|align=left| Campione d'Italia, Lombardy
|align=left|
|-
|Win
|
|align=left| Artem Solomko
|TKO
|4
|17/06/2005
|align=left| PalaLido, Milan, Lombardy
|align=left|
|-
|Win
|
|align=left| Radoslav Milutinovic
|TKO
|6
|20/05/2005
|align=left| Palazzetto dello Sport, Santa Marinella, Rome, Lazio
|align=left|
|-
|Win
|
|align=left| Joseph Marwa
|TD
|8
|18/12/2004
|align=left| Oberfrankenhalle, Bayreuth, Bavaria
|align=left|
|-
|Win
|
|align=left| Adrian Pop
|TKO
|7
|23/10/2004
|align=left| Tempodrom, Kreuzberg, Berlin
|align=left|
|-
|Win
|
|align=left| Ramdane Serdjane
|PTS
|10
|24/07/2004
|align=left| Civitavecchia, Lazio
|align=left|
|-
|Win
|
|align=left| Alain Simon
|TKO
|6
|13/04/2004
|align=left| Cava Manara, Lombardy
|align=left|
|-
|Win
|
|align=left| Sergi Martin Beaz
|TKO
|2
|27/03/2004
|align=left| PalaLottomatica, Rome, Lazio
|align=left|
|-
|Win
|
|align=left| Jesper Kristiansen
|UD
|12
|31/05/2003
|align=left| Aversa, Campania
|align=left|
|-
|Win
|
|align=left| Vincenzo Rossitto
|TKO
|10
|22/02/2003
|align=left| San Giuseppe Vesuviano, Campania
|align=left|
|-
|Win
|
|align=left| Turan Bagci
|TKO
|5
|05/11/2002
|align=left| Villa Erba, Cernobbio, Lombardy
|align=left|
|-
|Win
|
|align=left| Paolo Ferrara
|UD
|10
|24/08/2002
|align=left| Monte San Giovanni Campano, Lazio
|align=left|
|-
|Win
|
|align=left| Roberto Dominguez Perez
|UD
|10
|15/03/2002
|align=left| Fiuggi, Lazio
|align=left|
|-
|Loss
|
|align=left| Juan Carlos Gomez
|TKO
|6
|03/11/2001
|align=left| Hansehalle, Lübeck, Schleswig-Holstein
|align=left|
|-
|Win
|
|align=left| Paolo Ferrara
|UD
|10
|24/08/2001
|align=left| Formia, Lazio
|align=left|
|-
|Win
|
|align=left| Armando Grueso
|PTS
|6
|12/07/2001
|align=left| Torre Annunziata, Campania
|align=left|
|-
|Win
|
|align=left| Oleksiy Trofymov
|MD
|10
|23/02/2001
|align=left| Giugliano, Campania
|align=left|
|-
|Win
|
|align=left| Henry Kolle Njume
|PTS
|6
|23/06/2000
|align=left| Bergamo, Lombardy
|align=left|
|-
|Loss
|
|align=left| Johnny Nelson
|TKO
|7
|08/04/2000
|align=left| York Hall, Bethnal Green, London
|align=left|
|-
|Win
|
|align=left| Danut Moisa
|TKO
|2
|23/12/1999
|align=left| Torre Annunziata, Campania
|align=left|
|-
|Win
|
|align=left| Daniel Lingurici
|TKO
|3
|03/12/1999
|align=left| Milan, Lombardy
|align=left|
|-
|Win
|
|align=left| Mario Tonus
|PTS
|10
|19/11/1999
|align=left| San Dona di Piave, Veneto
|align=left|
|-
|Win
|
|align=left| Daniel Lingurici
|TKO
|3
|07/08/1999
|align=left| Civitavecchia, Lazio
|align=left|
|-
|Win
|
|align=left| Mario Tonus
|PTS
|10
|15/04/1999
|align=left| Sala Consilina, Campania
|align=left|
|-
|Win
|
|align=left| Ioan Mihai
|PTS
|6
|18/03/1999
|align=left| Toscolano-Maderno, Lombardy
|align=left|
|-
|Win
|
|align=left| Marco Guidelli
|PTS
|10
|09/11/1998
|align=left| Marina di Grosseto, Tuscany
|align=left|
|-
|Win
|
|align=left| Ion Ene
|TKO
|9
|15/08/1998
|align=left| Torre Annunziata, Campania
|align=left|
|-
|Win
|
|align=left| Nicolae Hoit
|TKO
|3
|02/07/1998
|align=left| Afragola, Campania
|align=left|
|-
|Win
|
|align=left| Salvatore Inserra
|PTS
|6
|29/05/1998
|align=left| Pesaro, Marche
|align=left|
|-
|Win
|
|align=left| Stefan Cekan
|TKO
|1
|14/03/1998
|align=left| Rodengo-Saiano, Lombardy
|align=left|
|-
|Win
|
|align=left| Zoltan Petranyi
|DQ
|6
|13/02/1998
|align=left| Torre Annunziata, Campania
|align=left|
|-
|Win
|
|align=left| Tibor Jevcak
|TKO
|1
|30/01/1998
|align=left| Castrovillari, Calabria
|align=left|
|-
|Win
|
|align=left| Yves Monsieur
|PTS
|6
|06/12/1997
|align=left| Catanzaro, Calabria
|align=left|
|-
|Win
|
|align=left| Henry Kolle Njume
|PTS
|6
|03/11/1997
|align=left| Castel Volturno, Campania
|align=left|
|-
|Win
|
|align=left| Richard Raffesberger
|KO
|1
|25/09/1997
|align=left| Castel Mella, Lombardy
|align=left|
|-
|Win
|
|align=left| Istvan Beszedes
|TKO
|4
|09/08/1997
|align=left| San Gennaro Vesuviano, Campania
|align=left|
|}

References

sports-reference

1976 births
Living people
People from Torre Annunziata
Light-heavyweight boxers
Boxers at the 1996 Summer Olympics
Olympic boxers of Italy
Italian male boxers
Sportspeople from the Province of Naples
20th-century Italian people